Simon, the Magician (Hungarian: Simon mágus) is a Hungarian-French film written & directed by Ildikó Enyedi. The film premiered at the 1999 Locarno Festival In Competition where it won the Don Quixote Award - Special Mention.

The film was released on DVD in 2002.

Plot
The film is about a Budapest magician named Simon who is called to help solve a crime by the Parisian police.

References

External links

Films directed by Ildikó Enyedi
Hungarian drama films
1999 films